Vladislav Vladimirovich Sirotov (born 27 October 1991) is a Russian professional football player. He plays for Leningradets Leningrad Oblast.

Club career
He made his Russian Football National League debut for FC Shinnik Yaroslavl on 11 July 2015 in a game against FC Baltika Kaliningrad.

External links
 
 
 
 Vladislav Sirotov at Sportbox.ru  
 

1991 births
Footballers from Saint Petersburg
Living people
Russian footballers
Russian expatriate footballers
Russia youth international footballers
Association football forwards
FC Tosno players
FC Shinnik Yaroslavl players
FC Zenit-2 Saint Petersburg players
Zagłębie Lubin players
FC Tekstilshchik Ivanovo players
FC Caspiy players
Russian First League players
Russian Second League players
Ekstraklasa players
Kazakhstan Premier League players
Latvian Higher League players
Russian expatriate sportspeople in Poland
Russian expatriate sportspeople in Kazakhstan
Russian expatriate sportspeople in Latvia
Expatriate footballers in Poland
Expatriate footballers in Kazakhstan
Expatriate footballers in Latvia
FC Chernomorets Novorossiysk players
FC Leningradets Leningrad Oblast players
FC Znamya Truda Orekhovo-Zuyevo players